The 1870 Maine gubernatorial election was held on September 12, 1870. Republican candidate Sidney Perham defeated the Democratic candidate Charles W. Roberts.

General election

Candidates

Republican 

 Sidney Perham

Democratic 

 Charles W. Roberts

Results

References 

Maine gubernatorial elections
Maine
1870 Maine elections